Thomas Y. Drake (June 28, 1936 – August 8, 2008), also credited professionally as T. Y. Drake and Tom Drake, was a Canadian singer-songwriter, film director and screenwriter.

Life and career
Drake began his career at nine years old when he became involved as a child actor in radio plays for the CBC in Vancouver. At the age of 12, he and his family moved to the United States where he began singing professionally with the choir from St. Paul's Cathedral and later studied English literature at the University of California in Los Angeles. During the 1960s, while working as an English teacher at a high school in San Diego, Drake wrote lyrics for The Kingston Trio and together with American actor Michael Storm, he co-founded The Good Time Singers, a folk group launched on The Andy Williams Show and released albums on the Capitol Records label.

By the late 1960s, Drake had abandoned his musical career and began working as a screenwriter. In 1971, he returned to Canada and settled on a farm in the Canadian Rockies with his wife Sally and their three sons. During this time, he wrote scripts for the American television series Then Came Bronson (1969–70) and The Psychiatrist (1971). In 1975, Drake made his motion picture debut as both screenwriter and director of The Keeper, a low-budget Canadian horror film starring Christopher Lee which never received theatrical distribution; he also wrote the screenplay for the 1980 horror film Terror Train starring Jamie Lee Curtis.

Since 1984, Drake and his wife moved permanently to Vancouver to be near their family. His sons, Steven and Adam Drake, also became known as successful Canadian musicians, and third son Jono Drake works in the production end of the film and TV industry in Vancouver.

Death
Thomas Y. Drake died of cancer on August 8, 2008 in Vancouver, British Columbia.

Filmography

References

External links

Tom Drake The Kingston Trio

1936 births
2008 deaths
Canadian folk singer-songwriters
Canadian television writers
Canadian male screenwriters
Canadian horror writers
Film directors from Vancouver
Writers from Vancouver
Canadian male television writers
Musicians from Vancouver
20th-century Canadian male singers
20th-century Canadian male writers
20th-century Canadian screenwriters